The Louisiana Street/Seventh Avenue Historic District is located in Sturgeon Bay, Wisconsin. It was listed on the National Register of Historic Places in 1983 and on the State Register of Historic Places in 1989.

References

Historic districts on the National Register of Historic Places in Wisconsin
National Register of Historic Places in Door County, Wisconsin